Following are the results of the Men's 3 m synchro springboard diving event at the 2001 World Aquatics Championships held in Fukuoka, Japan, on July 22, 2001.

In the men's 3m springboard Bo Peng and Ke-Nan Wang from China held the lead throughout the final round from the first round of six. Their winning total was 342.63. Peng commented on their win, "It was my first world championships and I was very nervous. I think we performed very well and timing was perfect.

In the third dive, the Mexican duo of Joel Rodríguez and Fernando Platas edged ahead of the Russians Aleksandr Dobroskok and Dmitri Sautin. The Mexicans took the silver with 338.49 and Russian close but settling for the bronze with 335.19. Sautin said, "I had to have an operation, and I'm still undergoing therapy. I'm feeling tired. In light of that the bronze medal is good."

Results

Green denotes finalists

External links
 FINA

Diving at the 2001 World Aquatics Championships